Raposo is a common surname in the Galician and Portuguese language, namely in Portugal and Brazil, meaning “fox”. Notable people with the surname include:

André Raposo (born 1978), Brazilian water polo player
Gregory Raposo (born 1985), American singer and actor
Joe Raposo (1937–1989), Portuguese-American composer, songwriter, and pianist
José Raposo (born 1963), Portuguese actor
Ryan Raposo (born 1999), Canadian soccer player of Portuguese and Chinese descent

Portuguese-language surnames